Berlin Hackescher Markt is a railway station in the Mitte district of Berlin, Germany. It is named after the adjacent Hackescher Markt square.

Overview
The station is located on the elevated Berlin Stadtbahn line, which crosses central Berlin from east to west. The Stadtbahn carries local S-Bahn services on one pair of tracks, and longer distance services on another pair. Longer distance services pass the station without stopping.

The station opened in 1882 and was originally named Börse (stock exchange) and then Marx-Engels-Platz during the GDR era. In 1992 it received the name Hackescher Markt from the adjacent square. Following the demolition of the Lehrter Stadtbahnhof (architecturally similar and previously listed), with Bellevue it is now one of only two Stadtbahn stations preserved in their original condition.

As well as its rail connections, the station is also served by four tram lines, two of which run continuously. There are no bus services serving the station during the day, but is one of two main hubs in Berlin's night bus network. At night, six bus lines serve the station and there are guaranteed connections between many of these and the tram lines running at this time.

Station layout

References

External links
 Technische Universität Berlin Architekturmuseum Inv: ZFB 35,013   
 Technische Universität Berlin Architekturmuseum Inv: ZFB 34,021 
 record 20576271 in bildindex der Kunst und Architektur
Station information (S-Bahn) 
 Image of the station
Hackescher Markt 

Hackescher Markt railway station
Hackescher Markt railway station
Hackescher Markt railway station
Railway stations in Germany opened in 1882